Tõdu is a village in Kanepi Parish, Põlva County in southeastern Estonia. It has a population of 43 (as of 1 August 2007).

Inside the Governorate of Livonia Tõdu belonged to historical Põlva Parish which was then part of Võru County. Tõdu knight manor (Tödwenshof) was located in the village.

References

Villages in Põlva County